The 1975–76 Cincinnati Bearcats men's basketball team represented the University of Cincinnati in the 1975-76 NCAA Division I men's basketball season. The Bearcats were led by head coach Gale Catlett, as first year members of the Metro Conference. They defeated Georgia Tech, and Memphis State to win the Metro tournament for the first consecutive year, and received the conference's automatic bid to the NCAA tournament. They lost 78-79 to Notre Dame.

Schedule

|-
!colspan=6 style=| Regular Season

|-
!colspan=12 style=|Metro Tournament

|-
!colspan=6 style=| Regular Season

|-
!colspan=12 style=| NCAA Tournament

References 

Cincinnati
Cincinnati Bearcats men's basketball seasons
Cincinnati Bearcats men's basketball
Cincinnati Bearcats men's basketball
Cincinnati